The 2014 World Judo Championships were held in Chelyabinsk, Russia, from 25–31 August 2014, in the Traktor Ice Arena. Each participating country was permitted to present a total of 18 men and women judokas to participate in the 14 weight categories (7 male and 7 female), but no more than two judokas from the same country were allowed to fight in the same category.

Bids
Bids were made by Azerbaijan, Russia, South Korea, United Arab Emirates, and the United States to the International Judo Federation for the initial staging of the championships. On 2 October 2012, it was announced that Russia would hold the full championships for the first time. Previously, the 1983 World Judo Championships had been held in the Soviet Union (Moscow) and the open category of the 2011 Championships were held in Tyumen. One reason for the choice was the successful staging of the 2012 European Judo Championships in Chelyabinsk.

On 17 December 2012, at the Ritz-Carlton in Moscow,  the President of IJF Marius Wizer, Mikhail Yurevich (the governor of Chelyabinsk Oblast) and Sergey Soloveychik, the vice-president of the Russian Judo Federation and the head of the European Judo Union, signed an agreement to host the championships.

On 2 September 2013, following the 2013 World Judo Championships, the flag of the International Judo Federation was passed to a representative of the Russian Judo Federation.

On 19 March 2014, the regulations of the competitions were approved for the competition. The championship took place between 25 and 31 August, with the individual tournament taking place between 25 and 30 August, and the team tournament on 31 August.

Venue

The championships were held at the Traktor Ice Arena, with a capacity of 7,500 spectators.

Mascot
The mascot of the championships was a baby tiger named Zhorik, a diminutive form of Georgiy. The mascot was chosen in a unanimous vote held before the 2012 European Judo Championships.

Logo
The logo of the championships was a blue-white rectangle, augmented at the base by a red belt. The colours of the logo repeat the Russian flag. The logo also features a white silhouette of Vladimir Putin taken from a photo on the cover of the book Learn Judo with Vladimir Putin.

Prize money
Total prize money was $300,000. The winner of the individual competition received $6,000 ($4,800 for the judoka and $1,200 for the coach), the runner-up $4,000 ($3,200 and $800, for the judoka and the coach respectively) and the bronze medalist $2,000 ($1,600 and $400, respectively). The two best judokas (man and woman) were awarded $2,000.

The winners of the team competition received a total of $25,000 ($20,000 for judokas and $5,000 for coaches), the runner-up $15,000 ($12,000 and $3,000 respectively) and the bronze medalist $5,000 ($4,000 and $1,000 respectively).

Rules 

The rules of competition changed on January 1, 2014.

The IJF continued to differentiate judo from other kinds of wrestling, particularly from sambo, and reverted to classical judo traditions. Activity by the hands below the belt in standing position, limited by 2010 rules, is now fully forbidden under penalty of disqualification. In the spirit of saving specific characteristics of judo, possibility of fight for hold is limited: wrong methods of protection from holds is prohibited, and there is a limit to the number of protections from holds. Likewise, other methods of evading fight or blocking of an opponent are forbidden; for example, false attacks or coercion to assume bend position by power. The criteria of victory by fall (ippon) is specified: now a throw must have more power, quickness and amplitude with the fall of the opponent straight to their back. Rituals about combat were also modified: for example, opponents must greet each other only by bows; as handshaking before combat is now forbidden. The Golden score overtime is not limited by time, and winning by judge decision is abolished.

Medal summary

Medal table

Men's events

Women's events

Participating nations

 (8)
 (2)
 (2)
 (1)
 (1)
 (5)
 (3)
 (11)
 (6)
 (4)
 (11)
 (1)
 (7)
 (1)
 (1)
 (3)
 (8)
 (6)
 (4)
 (5)
 (2)
 (9)
 (2)
 (18)
 (4)
 (11)
 (18)
 (3)
 (3)
 (1)
 (3)
 (13)
 (4)
 (7)
 (2)
 (5)
 (5)
 (4)
 (9)
 (1)
 (1)
 (18)
 (3)
 (4)
 (1)
 (10)
 (17)
 (4)
 (13)
 (7)
 (12)
 (18)
 (16)
 (11)
 (14)
 (5)
 (3)
 (3)
 (1)
 (6)
 (2)
 (2)
 (2)
 (18)
 (1)
 (3)
 (1)
 (10)
 (2)
 (1)
 (1)
 (3)
 (3)
 (2)
 (7)
 (2)
 (11)
 (13)
 (9)
 (8)
 (18)
 (1)
 (1)
 (5)
 (7)
 (6)
 (6)
 (9)
 (12)
 (5)
 (9)
 (4)
 (3)
 (17)
 (11)
 (10)
 (4)
 (3)

Notes
A.Unlike 2013, Kelmendi did not compete under the Kosovo flag but under the International Judo Federation flag.

References

External links

 
ippon.org - Results
ippon.org - Team competition - Results
intjudo.eu - Results
worldjudoday.com DAY 1
worldjudoday.com DAY 2
worldjudoday.com DAY 7

 
2014
World Championships
World Championships
Judo World Championships
Judo World Championships
Judo World Championships
August 2014 sports events in Russia